Patrick Hogan (1 January 1835 – 2 September 1918) was an Irish-born Australian politician.

He was born in Blackfort in County Tipperary to farmer Michael Hogan and Mary Fitzgerald. Educated locally, he migrated to New South Wales in 1861 and became a policeman. In 1863 he married Bridget Kelly, with whom he had six children. He worked as a commercial agent in the timber business, and was also an alderman and mayor at Waterloo. He was elected to the New South Wales Legislative Assembly in 1885 as the member for Richmond. He did not contest the 1887 election, but was returned in 1889 as the member for Macleay, representing the Protectionist Party. He transferred to Raleigh in 1894. He retired in 1895, although he did contest the 1898 election. Hogan died in 1918.

References

 

1835 births
1918 deaths
Australian police officers
Members of the New South Wales Legislative Assembly
Protectionist Party politicians
Irish emigrants to colonial Australia
Mayors of Waterloo
19th-century Australian businesspeople